Morozeni is a commune in Orhei District, Moldova. It is composed of two villages, Breanova and Morozeni.

References

Communes of Orhei District